Andrew Oliver (1706–1774) was a Massachusetts politician.

Andrew Oliver may also refer to:

 Andrew Oliver (1731–1799), jurist and scientist
 Andrew Oliver (New York politician) (1815–1889), U.S. Representative from New York
 Andrew C. Oliver, software developer
 Andy Oliver (Andrew Allen Oliver, born 1987), pitcher for the Pittsburgh Pirates
 Andrew Oliver, one of the Oliver Twins
 Andrew Oliver, the drummer of post-hardcore band I See Stars